Herbert Bayer (April 5, 1900 – September 30, 1985) was an Austrian and American graphic designer, painter, photographer, sculptor, art director, environmental and interior designer, and architect. He was instrumental in the development of the Atlantic Richfield Company's corporate art collection until his death in 1985.

Biography

Training and Bauhaus years

Bayer apprenticed under the artist Georg Schmidthammer in Linz. Leaving the workshop to study at the Darmstadt Artists' Colony, he became interested in Walter Gropius's Bauhaus manifesto. After Bayer had studied for four years at the Bauhaus under such teachers as Wassily Kandinsky, Paul Klee and László Moholy-Nagy, Gropius appointed Bayer director of printing and advertising.

In the spirit of reductive minimalism, Bayer developed a crisp visual style and adopted use of all-lowercase, sans serif typefaces for most Bauhaus publications. Bayer is one of several typographers of the period including Kurt Schwitters and Jan Tschichold who experimented with the creation of a simplified more phonetic-based alphabet. From 1925 to 1930 Bayer designed a geometric sans-serif Proposal for a Universal Typeface that existed only as a design and was never actually cast into real type. These designs are now issued in digital form as Bayer Universal. The design also inspired ITC Bauhaus and Architype Bayer, which bears comparison with the stylistically related typeface Architype Schwitters.

In 1923 Bayer met the photographer Irene Bayer-Hecht at the first large Bauhaus exhibit in Weimar. They married in 1925, separated in 1928, had a daughter, Julia Alexandra, in 1929, and divorced in 1944.

Post-Bauhaus years in Germany

In 1928, Bayer left the Bauhaus to become art director of Vogue magazine's Berlin office. He remained in Germany far later than most other progressives. In 1936 he designed a brochure for the Deutschland Ausstellung, an exhibition for tourists in Berlin during the 1936 Olympic Gamesthe brochure celebrated life in Nazi Germany, and the authority of Hitler. However, in 1937, works of Bayer's were included in the Nazi propaganda exhibition "Degenerate Art", upon which he left Germany. Upon fleeing Germany, he traveled in Italy.

Time in the United States

In 1944 Bayer married Joella Synara Haweis, the daughter of poet and Dada artist Mina Loy. The same year, he became a U.S. citizen.

In 1946 the Bayers relocated. Hired by industrialist and visionary Walter Paepcke, Bayer moved to Aspen, Colorado as Paepcke promoted skiing as a popular sport.  Bayer's architectural work in the town included co-designing the Aspen Institute and restoring the Wheeler Opera House, but his production of promotional posters identified skiing with wit, excitement, and glamour.

In 1959, he designed his "fonetik alfabet", a phonetic alphabet, for English. It was sans-serif and without capital letters. He had special symbols for the endings -ed, -ory, -ing, and -ion, as well as the digraphs "ch", "sh", and "ng". An underline indicated the doubling of a consonant in traditional orthography.

While living in Aspen, Bayer had a chance meeting with the eccentric oilman, outdoorsman and visionary ecologist, Robert O. Anderson.  When Anderson saw the ultra-modern, Bauhaus-inspired home that Bayer had designed & built in Aspen, he walked up to the front door and introduced himself.  It was the beginning of a lifelong friendship between the two men and instigated Anderson's insatiable passion for enthusiastically collecting contemporary art.

With Anderson's eventual formation of the Atlantic Richfield Company, and as his personal art collection quickly overflowed out of his New Mexico ranch and other homes, ARCO soon held the unique distinction of possessing the world's largest corporate art collection, under the critical eye and sharp direction of Bayer as ARCO's Art and Design Consultant.

Overseeing acquisitions for ARCO Plaza, the newly built (1972) twin 51-story office towers in Los Angeles that served as the new company's corporate headquarters, Bayer was also responsible for the ARCO logo and designing all corporate branding related to the company. Prior to the completion of ARCO Plaza, Anderson commissioned Bayer to design a monumental sculpture-fountain to be installed between the dark green granite towers. Originally titled "Stairway to Nowhere" Anderson laughed, but felt the Shareholders wouldn't see the irony; thus he suggested it be named Double Ascension and it still stands between the twin skyscrapers today.

Under Bayer's direction, ARCO's art collection grew to nearly 30,000 works nationwide, managed by Atlantic Richfield Company Art Collection staff.  ARCO's collection was eclectic, and consisted of an extremely wide range of media & styles; ranging from contemporary and earlier paintings, sculpture, works on paper (including drawings, watercolors and signed original lithographs, etchings and serigraphs) and signed photographs to tribal and ethnic art from many cultures, as well as historic prints and artifacts, all displayed throughout ARCO's buildings in Los Angeles and several other cities. Three years after ARCO was taken over by BP in 2000, that company's then-chairman, Lord Brown, personally ordered ARCO's art collection liquidated. It was sold through Christie's and LA Modern Auctions.

Bayer made provisions to donate, after his death, a collection of his works which had been housed in ARCO's conference center in Santa Barbara to the Los Angeles County Museum of Art. The works have been loaned previously to the Denver Art Museum. He was elected a Fellow of the American Academy of Arts and Sciences in 1979.

Legacy and influence
Bayer's works appear in prominent public and private collections including the MIT List Visual Arts Center. Bayer designed the Mill Creek Canyon Earthworks, an environmental sculpture located in Kent, Washington.

In 2019, the philanthropists and entrepreneurs Lynda and Stewart Resnick donated $10 million to the nonprofit Aspen Institute for a center dedicated to Bayer that will be located on the Institute's Aspen Meadows campus, which Bayer designed. The facility, the Resnick Center for Herbert Bayer Studies, is to have galleries, educational programs, and an overall aim to provide tools for the preservation and study of Bayer's work.

Herbert Bayer was the architect for the Modern Art Museum of Fort Worth, in Fort Worth, Texas. The institution moved to its new location designed by architect Tadao Ando in 2002. The building, owned by the City of Fort Worth, is now the Fort Worth Community Arts Center, which features seven galleries highlighting regional and national artists.

Fonts designed
 Proposal for a Universal Type (1925–1930), this face existed only as designs.
 Bayer Type (Berthold Type Foundry, 1933)

Decorations and awards
 Culture Prize of the German Society for Photography (Cologne, 1969)
 Inducted into the Hall of Fame by the Art Directors Club (1975)
 Architecture Forum Upper Austria in Linz
 Honorary doctorate from the Technical University of Graz (1977)
 Austrian Cross of Honour for Science and Art (1977)
 Ambassador's Award for Excellence (London)

See also
List of Austrian artists and architects

References

General references

Herbert Bayer: Kunst Universell. Vienna, Austria: Edition Suppan Fine Arts, 1997

External links 
herbert bayer
 
Art Directors Club bio and portrait of Herbert Bayer
Herbert Bayer: Bauhaus and Beyond

1900 births
1985 deaths
AIGA medalists
American graphic designers
ARCO
Austrian graphic designers
Austro-Hungarian emigrants to the United States
Austrian emigrants to the United States
Bauhaus alumni
Academic staff of the Bauhaus
Fellows of the American Academy of Arts and Sciences
People from Grieskirchen District
American typographers and type designers
Recipients of the Austrian Cross of Honour for Science and Art
Austrian typographers and type designers
20th-century American architects
Federal Art Project artists